William Peter "Slim" Emmerich (September 29, 1919 – September 17, 1998) was an American professional baseball player.

Emmerich made his Major League Baseball debut in 1945 with the New York Giants. He was drafted from the St. Louis Cardinals in the 1944 Rule 5 draft, and played during the 1945 (31 games pitched) and 1946 (two games) seasons. In 104 innings pitched in the Majors, he allowed 117 hits and 33 bases on balls, with 28 strikeouts. Seven of his 33 career appearances were as a starting pitcher, and he notched one complete game, a 5–1, seven-hit victory over the Philadelphia Phillies at Shibe Park.

Emmerich's pro career lasted 12 seasons, beginning in 1940 through 1951.

References

External links

1919 births
1998 deaths
Albany Senators players
Allentown Wings players
Baseball players from Pennsylvania
Dallas Eagles players
Jersey City Giants players
Lexington Indians players
Los Angeles Angels (minor league) players
Major League Baseball pitchers
Martinsville Manufacturers players
Minneapolis Millers (baseball) players
Nashville Vols players
New York Giants (NL) players
Rochester Red Wings players
Sportspeople from Allentown, Pennsylvania
Springfield Cubs players